El Rito Crags is a rock climbing destination in Carson National Forest considered to be one of New Mexico's best sport climbing venues.  In addition to the sport climbing area, El Rito has a large cliff with many easy to moderate trad climbing routes.

External links
 Rock Climbing New Mexico

Geography of Rio Arriba County, New Mexico
Tourist attractions in Rio Arriba County, New Mexico
Climbing areas of New Mexico